Valentin Sergeyevich Shurchanov (19 April 1947 – 18 December 2020) was a Russian politician and journalist. He was born in Kanashsky District, Soviet Union. From 1999 to 2003 and again from 2007 until his death, Shurchanov was a member of the State Duma. He was a member of the Communist Party.

Valentin Shurchanov was Communist candidate for presidency of Chuvashia in 1997, 2001 and 2015. From 2005 to 2009 he was editor-in-chief of Pravda.

Shurchanov died from COVID-19 on 18 December 2020, in Moscow during the COVID-19 pandemic in Russia. He was 73.

References

1947 births
2020 deaths
Members of the Federation Council of Russia (1996–2000)
Third convocation members of the State Duma (Russian Federation)
Fifth convocation members of the State Duma (Russian Federation)
Sixth convocation members of the State Duma (Russian Federation)
Seventh convocation members of the State Duma (Russian Federation)
Russian journalists
Communist Party of the Russian Federation members
Deaths from the COVID-19 pandemic in Russia
People from Kanashsky District